Ilanga gratiosa is a species of sea snail, a marine gastropod mollusk in the family Solariellidae.

Distribution
This marine species occurs off Southern Cape Province, South Africa

References

  Thiele J., 1925. Gastropoden der Deutschen Tiefsee-Expedition. In:. Wissenschaftliche Ergebnisse der Deutschen Tiefsee-Expedition auf dem Dampfer “Valdivia” 1898-1899  II. Teil, vol. 17, No. 2, Gustav Fischer, Berlin

External links
 To World Register of Marine Species

gratiosa
Gastropods described in 1925